Judson is an unincorporated community in Summers County, West Virginia, United States, located west of Alderson and northeast of Hinton.

References

Unincorporated communities in Summers County, West Virginia
Unincorporated communities in West Virginia